Louis F. Edwards (18921939) was an American mayor of Long Beach, New York who was assassinated on 15 November 1939. He was fatally shot by a disgruntled police officer union official. He had a career in The Bronx as a haberdasher and a paint manufacturer before retiring early on his family's fortune and running for mayor of Long Beach in 1937.

Death 

On 15 November 1939, Edwards was fatally shot by a police officer at 10:15 am on the sidewalk in front of his home at 15 West Beech Street as he started for his office. Officer Alvin Dooley, former head of the local police union as well as member of the police motorcycle squad and the mayor's own security detail, killed Edwards after losing his bid for reelection as PBA president to a candidate the mayor supported; the assailant also shot and wounded another mayoral bodyguard, the officer who had unseated him. Dooley was tried and convicted of first degree manslaughter and sentenced to a term of ten to twenty years in prison. He was paroled after 10 years, in 1949 but in 1959 was returned to prison for parole violation after he was accused of sexually abusing a girlfriend's adolescent daughter. He died in prison in 1965. Jackson Boulevard was later renamed Edwards Boulevard in honor of the late mayor. After the murder, the city residents passed legislation to adopt a city manager system, which still exists to this day. The city manager is hired by and reports to the City Council.

See also 
 List of assassinated American politicians

References 

1939 deaths
1939 murders in the United States
Assassinated American politicians
Assassinated mayors
Deaths by firearm in New York (state)
New York (state) Democrats
Mayors of places in New York (state)
American manslaughter victims
Date of birth unknown
People shot dead by law enforcement officers in the United States

Assassinated American county and local politicians